Ivesia webberi is a species of flowering plant in the rose family known by the common names wire mousetail and Webber's ivesia. It is native to the United States, where it occurs in the northernmost part of the Sierra Nevada and the adjacent Modoc Plateau in California, its range extending just into Nevada.

This is a small perennial herb forming a clump on the ground in the clay soil of the local sage scrub. Each leaf is up to 7 centimeters long and is made up of several hairy, lance-shaped green leaflets each 3 to 10 millimeters long. The red to reddish-green stems are generally not erect and are up to 15 centimeters long on the ground or drooping over it. A stem bears an inflorescence made up of a single cluster of several flowers. Each flower is about a centimeter wide with five triangular to lance-shaped greenish sepals and five bright yellow petals. In the center of the flower are five stamens and usually five pistils.

References

External links
The Jepson Manual, Jepson eFlora, 2012 — Ivesia webberi.  
Center for Plant Conservation: Ivesia webberi. — 2012.
California Native Plant Society: Ivesia webberi — Inventory of Rare and Endangered Plants of California.
Ivesia webberi — CalPhotos 

webberi
Flora of California
Flora of Nevada
Flora of the Sierra Nevada (United States)
Critically endangered flora of California
Critically endangered flora of the United States